The Blouberg (formerly "Blaauwberg"), meaning "Blue Mountain" in Dutch, is a range of mountains in Limpopo Province, at the far north of South Africa. It is located in Blouberg Local Municipality, Capricorn District. The mountain is entrenched in the history of the local Northern Sotho people, and they have different names for its various parts.

The Blouberg forms part of the 'Vhembe Biosphere Reserve', named a biosphere reserve by UNESCO since 2009. This reserve also includes the neighboring Makgabeng Plateau, the Soutpansberg, the northern part of the Kruger National Park, the Makuleke Wetlands and the Mapungubwe Cultural Landscape. The eastern and part of the central Blouberg prominences are enclosed and protected by the Blouberg Nature Reserve. A 4x4 track traverses Rapanyan's Neck, the defile that separates these easterly subranges.

Setting
This rocky mountain range rises over a plateau averaging 900 m to the west of the western end of the Soutpansberg range. The Blouberg is topped by massive rocky outcrops resembling castles or fortifications with sheer walls. Its highest point reaches 2,040 m and is also the highest point of the entire Soutpansberg/Blouberg system.
The Brak River (also known as Hout River), a tributary of the Sand River, flows diagonally along the southeastern edge of the Blouberg, separating it from the Soutpansberg further east. Although both ranges are clearly delimited from the geographical point of view, geologically the Blouberg is homonymous with the Soutpansberg.

Human population
About 117 settlements in its foothills are home to some 161,000 inhabitants, belonging to the Bahananwa nation. Senwabarwana, the economic centre of these villages, is visited by many to do their shopping. During the 19th century they were incorporated in the South African Republic, and the homeland system was introduced during the Apartheid era of the 20th century. Basic infrastructure and developmental needs were neglected, and in the 21st century it remains one of Limpopo's most underdeveloped regions. Many villages experience high unemployment, severe poverty or low levels of income despite the area's natural resources. Their isolation is mitigated by their sense of community and connectivity to each other.

Ecology
The vegetation of the Blouberg ranges from sub-tropical veld or savanna at the base, to a type of Afro-montane vegetation related to the Cape Fynbos near the summits. The rocky cliffs are a haven for birds of prey such as the Cape vultures.

The Blouberg, like its larger neighbor further east, the Soutpansberg, is known for a high level of endemism of its invertebrate fauna, such as the Swanepoel's widow butterfly that is found on the southern slopes of the range. The Waterberg flat lizard and a subspecies of the common flat lizard are found in this range.

Rock climbing
The Blouberg is one of the most spectacular rock climbing areas in South Africa. As a rock climbing destination it is famous for its sheer 350 m "Moonshadow" wall. Most of the climbing spots are on private land but climbers can make arrangements through the Alldays Mountain Club in nearby Alldays, Limpopo.

See also
 List of mountain ranges of South Africa

References

External links
Major vegetation types of the Soutpansberg Conservancy and the Blouberg Nature Reserve, South Africa
Lepidopterists Society of Africa, Lepsoc.- Blouberg Nature Reserve
 Blouberg Municipality Website
African Rock Adventure

Mountain ranges of Limpopo